The Rashtra Sevika Samiti (National Women Volunteers Committee) is a Hindu nationalist women's organisation that parallels the Rashtriya Swayamsevak Sangh (RSS) for men.  Even though it is often referred to as the " Sister" of the RSS, the organisation claims that it is independent of the RSS while sharing its ideology. Membership and leadership is embraced to women and its activities are directed to nationalist devotion and mobilisation of Hindu women.

The current Chief (Sanskrit: Pramukh Sanchalika) of the Samiti is  V. Shantha Kumari (referred to informally as "Shanthakka") and its General Secretary (Pramukh Karyavahika) is Sita Annadanam.

History
Before establishing the organization, Kelkar visited Dr. K.B. Hedgewar, the founder of the RSS, in 1936 and had a long discussion to persuade him regarding the need for starting a women's wing in the Rashtriya Swayamsevak Sangh itself. However, Hedgewar advised Laxmibai Kelkar to establish an entirely separate organization that would be autonomous and independent of the RSS, as both groups were ideologically identical. Hedgewar promised Kelkar unconditional solidarity, support and guidance for the Samithi. Following this, Kelkar established the Rashtra Sevika Samiti at Wardha on 25 October 1936.

Activities
Rashtra Sevika Samiti is today the largest Hindu organization working to uphold Indian culture and traditions. The current ruling party Bhartiya Janta Party(BJP) is the political arm of RSS.RSS women are actively involved in socio-cultural activities. Samiti inculcates a sense of responsible behaviour and social awareness in people. Various types of educational and awareness  camps at different levels in all parts of India are conducted periodically.

Active Shakhas (local branches with regular gatherings of members where they practice yoga, sing nationalist/patriotic songs, military training and have discussions) of the Samiti currently operate in 5215 centers. 875 centers conduct the Shakhas on a daily basis. The estimates of active membership range from 100,000
to 1 million
It has overseas branches in 10 countries, which use the name Hindu Sevika Samiti.

Samiti also runs 475 service projects all over India for the poor and underprivileged, with regard to religion, caste, creed, sect, gender, or ethnicity. These include Go Shalas , libraries, computer training centers and orphanages.

Rashtra Sevika Samiti focuses on Hindu women's role in the society as leaders and agents of positive social reform. Samiti teaches its members three ideals;
 Matrutva (Universal Motherhood)
 Kartrutva (Efficiency and Social Activism)
 Netrutva (Leadership).

3 personalities who stand for the above ideals, Jijabai, Ahilyabai Holkar and Rani of Jhansi respectively are held as a role model for every sevika. The organization believes that all  women have the capability to create a positive change in their community

Chiefs of the organization
 Laxmibai Kelkar (मावशी लक्ष्मीबाई केळकर, Founder, known as Mavashi Kelkar), from October 1936 to November 1978 (her death)
 Saraswati Apte (सरस्वती आपटे, knows as Tai Apte), 1978-1994
 Usha-tai Chati (उषाताई चाटी, Aug 1927 - Aug 2017), headed the organization from 1994 to 2006
 Pramila-tai Medhe (प्रमिला-ताई मेढे), 2006-2012, currently acts as advisor
 V Shantha Kumari (शान्ताक्का, Shanthakka, born 1952); chief from 2012 to date

See also 
Durga Vahini
Rashtriya Swayamsevak Sangh

References

Further reading
Bacchetta, Paola. Gender in the Hindu Nation: RSS Women as Ideologues.  New Delhi: Women Unlimited, 2004, .

External links
Vandaneeya Laxmibai Kelkar - The founder Pramukh Sanchalika of Rashtra Sevika Samiti

Women's wings of political parties in India
Sangh Parivar
Hindu organizations
Hindu nationalism
Rashtriya Swayamsevak Sangh
Hindutva